The Chohong Museum of Finance is a numismatics museum in Seoul, South Korea.

See also
List of museums in South Korea

External links
Official site

Museums in Seoul
Numismatic museums in Asia